Crash Romeo is an American pop punk band from Bernardsville, New Jersey.

History
Crash Romeo was formed by members who had previously played together in the band Centsless. Members of the band Bedlight for Blue Eyes suggested the band to their label Trustkill Records, who signed the group late in 2005. Their debut, Minutes to Miles appeared on the label the following year, produced by Chris Badami. A follow-up full-length, Gave Me the Clap, was released in 2008. In 2021, Crash Romeo recorded their third album Ashtrays and Apathy and is set to be released March 2023.

Band members
Travis Weber - vocals, guitar 
Ryan Weber - drums
Steve Anderson - guitar
Steve Mathews - bass, vocals

Discography
Minutes to Miles (Trustkill, 2006)
Gave Me the Clap (Trustkill, 2008)
Ashtrays and Apathy (Broken Graves Records, 2023)

References

Musical groups established in 2004
Pop punk groups from New Jersey
Trustkill Records artists